The Battle of Long Định  was a battle of the Vietnam War between the Viet Cong (VC) and the Army of the Republic of Vietnam (ARVN).

Background
U.S. helicopter surveillance had spotted a large group of VC fighters assembling in a forest glade near Long Dinh. General Nguyễn Khánh immediately rushed his infantry forces there, using M113 armored personnel carriers.

Operation
On 26 February 1964, three-thousand ARVN soldiers encircled the VC 514th Battalion at Long Định. During the 8-hour battle, the ARVN avoided contact with the VC, instead the ARVN commander relied on air and artillery strikes to inflict damage. As a result, the VC 514th Battalion was able to slip through the gaps and successfully withdraw from the area, using sniper teams to secure river crossings.

Aftermath
Due to the incompetence of the ARVN at this battle, General Khánh sacked five of his division commanders.

References
 Bowman, John S. (1985). The Vietnam War: An Almanac. Pharos Books. 

Battles and operations of the Vietnam War
Battles involving the United States
Battles and operations of the Vietnam War in 1964
February 1964 events in Asia
History of Tiền Giang Province